Ruth Conroy Dalton is a British architect, author and Professor of Architecture at Northumbria University. She has authored or contributed to more than 200 publications. She is an expert in space syntax analysis, pedestrian movement and wayfinding and a world-leading authority on the overlap between architecture and spatial cognition (architectural cognition).  

She is known for her work on using virtual reality to research wayfinding behaviours; her theories on how people try to limit their cumulative angular deviation when wayfinding; applying angular weightings to standard space syntax axial analysis (with Nick Dalton and Alasdair Turner); adding depth decay functions to network graphs (also with Nick Dalton); using small graph matching techniques to research building typology and, most recently, her work on social wayfinding.

Early life 

She attended Ackworth School, West Yorkshire. She received her Bachelor of Architecture from the Bartlett School of Architecture, University College London in 1991, Masters in Advanced Architectural Studies in 1996, and qualified as a licensed architect in 2000 before earning a PhD in Architecture in 2001, also from the Bartlett, UCL. Her PhD provided the first evidence that there were statistically significant similarities between patterns of navigation and movement in the real world and in virtual reality. This was significant because it meant that wayfinding experiments conducted in virtual simulations could be predictive of real-world patterns of pedestrian movement.

Career 

As a licensed architect, she has worked for Foster and Partners (1991–1994) and Sheppard Robson (1994–95) and key projects upon which she has worked include the Carré d'Art de Nîmes, in France, the Palacio de Congresos de Valencia, Spain, and the London King's Cross railway station International Terminal (unbuilt). She taught at the Architectural Association School of Architecture in London before taking up permanent academic appointments at the Georgia Institute of Technology (2001–2004), the Bartlett School of Architecture, University College London (2004–2010), and Northumbria University (2010–2019), where she was Head of Department for the Architecture and Built Environment Department, the first woman to hold the post, as well as Founding member & Inaugural Chair of Northumbria University's newly formed Professoriate. In 2019 she became the Inaugural/Founding Professor of Architecture and Head of the Lancaster School of Architecture in the Lancaster Institute for the Contemporary Arts at Lancaster University, before returning to Northumbria University in 2022.

In 2016, she was part of the team of scientists, neuroscientists and experts in dementia behind the crowdsourced navigation game/app Sea Hero Quest, played by ~4.3M people. Her role on the team was working with Glitchers to design the game levels at varying degrees of spatial complexity and navigational difficulty (due to her background in researching the relationship between spatial complexity and wayfinding performance).

Selected works

Books
 
 
 Dalton, Ruth Conroy (2022). Living in Houses: A Personal History of English Domestic Architecture. ISBN 978-1848224957.

Selected papers
 Coutrot, Antoine; Manley, Ed; Goodroe, Sara; Gahnstrom, Christoffer; Filomena, Gabriele; Yesiltepe, Demet; Dalton, Ruth C.; Wiener, Jan M.; Hölscher, Christoph; Hornberger, Michael; Spiers, Hugo J. (March 2022). "Entropy of city street networks linked to future spatial navigation ability". Nature. doi: 10.1038/s41586-022-04486-7

References 

Year of birth missing (living people)
Living people
People educated at Ackworth School
British women architects
21st-century English architects
Alumni of University College London
Architects from Yorkshire